The 2006 Korea National League Championship was the third competition of the Korea National League Championship. Gumi Siltron, Hwaseong Shinwoo Electronics and Yeosu FC were invited to the competition.

Group stage

Group A

Group B

Group C

Group D

Knockout stage

Bracket

Semi-finals

Final

See also
2006 in South Korean football
2006 Korea National League

References

External links

Korea National League Championship seasons
National Championship